Events from the year 1359 in Ireland.

Incumbent
Lord: Edward III

Events
 Thomas de Burley, Prior of the Order of St. John of Jerusalem appointed Lord Chancellor of Ireland

Births
 James Butler, 3rd Earl of Ormond, died 1405

Deaths

References

 
1350s in Ireland
Ireland
Years of the 14th century in Ireland